Cocytinus is an extinct genus of prehistoric amphibian.

This genus was given the name "Cocytinus" by Edward Drinker Cope.

See also
 Prehistoric amphibian
 List of prehistoric amphibians

References

Lysorophians
Fossil taxa described in 1871
Taxa named by Edward Drinker Cope